The Last Times was a tabloid underground newspaper published in San Francisco in 1967 by beatnik poet and printer Charles Plymell. It lasted only two issues, but included work by William Burroughs, Claude Pelieu, Allen Ginsberg, and Charles Bukowski.

The Last Times featured William Burroughs' text Day the Records Went Up, Claude Pelieu's Do It Yourself & Dig It, Allen Ginsberg's poem "Television Was A Baby Crawling Toward that Deathchamber", and a Charles Bukowski column.

The Last Times #1 and 2 also contained articles by French avant-gardist Jean-Jacques Lebel and Man Suicided by Society by Antonin Artaud, translated by Mary Beach, Plymell's mother-in-law. Issue #1 also contains the first Plymell printed work of R. Crumb that Plymell had "lifted" from the second issue of Yarrowstalks (a Philadelphia-based underground newspaper).

Plymell subsequently earned a bit of immortality in the underground press by publishing only the first printing of Robert Crumb's Zap Comix #1, which Don Donahue took over from Plymell when he purchased his Multilith 1250 printing press soon after.

Notes

References

External links 
 Charles Plymell and ‘Now‘, Reality Studio blog
 Charley Plymell: Zap and S. Clay Wilson

Newspapers established in 1967
Publications disestablished in 1967
Newspapers published in the San Francisco Bay Area
Works of the Beat Generation